Željko Savić ( born 18 March 1988) is a Bosnian Serb football defender who plays for FK Omladinac Novi Banovci in Serbia.

Club career
Born in Bihać, SR Bosnia and Herzegovina, back then still within SFR Yugoslavia, Savic started playing in Serbia with lower-league side FK Omladinac Novi Banovci. In 2012, he moved to Inđija playing in second level, Serbian First League.

Joining Bruneian club DPMM for the 2017 S.League season in 2017 via Trebol Sports International, Savic was impressed with his teammates efforts during practice and was surprised by the leagues different playing style, saying that they liked pushing forward. Settling well into the team, the defender formed a salubrious relationship with his teammates, making his debut in a 2-0 win over Hougang United, their first victory of the season. However, he let slip 4 goals and was substituted before half-time when Home United beat DPMM 9-3 on May 25, 2017, which proved to be his last game for the Bruneian outfit.

References

External links

1988 births
Living people
People from Bihać
Serbs of Bosnia and Herzegovina
Association football central defenders
Serbian footballers
Bosnia and Herzegovina footballers
FK Inđija players
Seinäjoen Jalkapallokerho players
Kemi City F.C. players
DPMM FC players
FC Honka players
Turun Palloseura footballers
Serbian First League players
Veikkausliiga players
Ykkönen players
Singapore Premier League players
Bosnia and Herzegovina expatriate footballers
Serbian expatriate footballers
Expatriate footballers in Finland
Bosnia and Herzegovina expatriate sportspeople in Finland
Serbian expatriate sportspeople in Finland
Expatriate footballers in Brunei